Garry Allen (11 August 1945 – 5 May 2022) was a New Zealand cricketer. He played in three first-class and three List A matches for Wellington from 1976 to 1980.

Allen and his father, Ray Allen, who played for Wellington in the 1940s, operated the family trucking business WH Allen Ltd. Garry was prominent in harness racing, and he owned and bred several champion racehorses. He was chairman of Harness Racing New Zealand from 2011 to 2016.

See also
 List of Wellington representative cricketers

References

External links
 

1945 births
2022 deaths
New Zealand cricketers
Wellington cricketers
Cricketers from Wellington City